The year 698 BC was a year of the pre-Julian Roman calendar. In the Roman Empire, it was known as year 56 Ab urbe condita . The denomination 698 BC for this year has been used since the early medieval period, when the Anno Domini calendar era became the prevalent method in Europe for naming years.

Events

By topic

Exploration, colonization 
 Greek colonization of the Mediterranean in the next two centuries will be motivated primarily by a need to find new food sources as Greece's population expands. The barren and rocky soil of the Greek Peninsula is inadequate to meet the people's alimentary needs (approximate date).

Births

Deaths
 Chuzi I, ruler of the state of Qin
 Duke Xi of Qi, ruler of the state of Qi

References